Nijō Tamesada (二条為定, 1293–1360), also known as Fujiwara no Tamesada (藤原為定), was a Japanese courtier and waka poet of the late Kamakura period and Nanbokuchō period.

Biography 
Nijō Tamesada was born in 1293. His father was Nijō Tamemichi, and his mother was a daughter of Asukai Masaari, Tamemichi's father was Nijō Tameyo, Tameyo being a son of Nijō Tameuji, a grandson of Fujiwara no Tameie, and a great-grandson of Fujiwara no Teika. Tamesada was a member of the Nijō branch of the Fujiwara clan, so is known as both Nijō Tamefuji and Fujiwara no Tamefuji.

He died on the fourteenth day of the third month of Enbun 5 (1360).

References

Works cited 

 
 
 

1293 births
1360 deaths
Fujiwara clan
Nijō family
14th-century Japanese poets